René Félix Allendy (19 February 1889 – 12 July 1942) was a French psychoanalyst and homeopath.

Life 
He contracted pneumonia at three years and was a sickly child, afflicted with diphtheria and other serious ailments. After  successfully completing secondary school, he studied Russian and Swedish and obtained a medical degree from the School of Medicine in Paris in 1912. A few days later, he married Yvonne Nel-Dumouchel, who was his companion and assistant until her death in 1935. Allendy after the death of Yvonne married her sister Colette.

In 1914 he was mobilized for World War I, but was diagnosed with tuberculosis and returned to civilian life. At the latter he trialed a homeopath therapy prevention of tuberculosis between 1932 and 1939.

In 1922 he founded with his wife Yvonne at the Sorbonne the Groupe d'études philosophiques et scientifiques pour l'examen des idées nouvelles, dedicated to the promotion of humanistic and scientific novelties. It attracted a range of prominent artists to give talks. In 1924 he underwent analysis with René Laforgue and was trained to practice as a psychoanalyst. In 1926, Princess Marie Bonaparte, a protogée of Freud, was a founding member of the Psychoanalytic Society of Paris, of which he was secretary between 1928 and 1931.

Anaïs Nin was a patient and later a lover of Dr. Allendy in 1932 . The story of the relationship between Allendy and Nin is described in detail in the diaries of Anaïs Nin, specifically in the volume entitled: Henry and June. Dr. Allendy also analyzed Antonin Artaud .

Works
L'alchimie et la médecine : étude sur les théories hermétiques dans l'histoire de la médecine (1912)
La psychanalyse et les névroses (1924), with René Laforgue
Les rêves et leur interprétation psychanalytique (1926)
Le problème de la Destinée (1927)
Orientations des idées médicales (1928)
La justice intérieure (1931)
La psychanalyse : doctrines et applications (1931)
Capitalisme et sexualité (1932), with Yvonne Allendy
Essai sur la guérison (1934)
Paracelse, le médecin maudit (1937)
Rêves expliqués (1938)
Aristote ou le complexe de trahison (1942)
Journal d'un médecin malade (1944)
Les constitutions psychiques (2002), Éditions L'Harmattan,

References

1889 births
1942 deaths
French homeopaths
French psychoanalysts